Villages located in Ladnu Tehsil, Rajasthan State, India.

Anesariya
Asota
Badela
Bader
Baldoo
Balsamand
Bakaliya
Ber
Bhamas
Bharnawa
Bhidasari
Bhiyani
Bithooda
Chak Goredi
Chandrai
Chhapara
Chundasar
Dabri Jodha ratnot
Dateau

Deora
Dheengsari
Dholiya
Dhurila
Dhyawa
Dobron Ka Bas
Dujar
Firwasi
Genana
Gheerdoda Khara
Gheerdoda Meetha
Girdharipura
Godaron Ka Bas
Goredi
Gunpaliya
Hirawati
Hudas
Husenpura
Indrapura
Jaswant Garh
Jatawas
Jeslan
Jhardiya
Jhekariya
Kasan
Kasumbi Alipur
Kasumbi Jakhlan
Kasumbi Naliya
Kasumbi Upadara
Khamiyad
Khangar
Khanpur

Khindas
Khokhari
Koyal
Kumasiya
Kushalpura
Kusumbi Alipur
Kusumbi Upadra
Kusumbi Jakhala
Kusumbi Naliya
Lachhri
Ladnu
Ledi
Lodsar
Lukas
Malasi
Malgaon
Mangalpura
Manu
Manu Ki Dhani
Meendasari
Meethari Marwar
Nandwan
Natas
Nimbi Jodhan
Odint
Padampura
Peepakuri
Phirwasi
Raidhana
Rampura
Ratau
Ratheel
Reengan
Rewaron Ka Bas
Ridmalas
Rodu
Roja
Sandas
Sanwrad
Sardi
Seenwa
Shimla
Shyampura
Sikrali
Silanwad
Sunari
Tanwara
Tiloti
Tipani
Titri
Toki
Tilokpura
Udrasar
Vishwanathpura

References

Ladnu Tehsil
Ladnu Tehsil villages